Perusahaan Umum Pengangkutan Penumpang Djakarta (lit. Djakarta Passenger Transport Public Company, simplified as Perum PPD) is an Indonesian state-owned company that moves in the transportation sector, specifically land transportation in Jakarta and areas around. It is known that Perum PPD operates approximately 494 single buses and 59 articulated buses for TransJakarta. Perum PPD is also known to operate JA Connexion, JR Connexion and Transjabodetabek routes serving Jakarta's suburban area and Trans Sarbagita in Denpasar, Bali.

History 

Founded back at 1920, Perum PPD is a state owned company that is under control of the Ministry of Transportation that went along with the country's history. What would be Perum PPD, which have been commissioned as a public company in 1981 based on Government Regulation No. 24 of 1981 which is enhanced into Government Regulation No. 32 of 1984, is the result of merging the Nederlandsch Indische Tram Maatschappij with the Bataviasch Elektrische Tram Maatschappij approaching in 1925 corresponding with the advice from the Burgemeester of Batavia City which was under Ir. Voorneman and became Bataviasche Verkeers Maatschappij (BVM NV).

However, since the occupation of Japan in Indonesia from 1942 until 1945, BVM NV was changed into Djakarta Shinden which only operates the city's tram. City buses from the BVM NV was used for other needs. Just a day after The Nation proclaimed independence, a number of workers of Djakarta Shinden sponsored by Menteng 31 youth urged for the Japanese authorities to immediately hand over the tram to the youth. Since 20 August 1945, the tram was handed over to the Indonesian Government and was operated by Djawatan Kereta Api tram section.

To prioritize public interest, BVMNV was then nationalized and controlled by the Transport Minister under Emergency Act No.10 of 1954. As a follow-up to the nationalization, with deed from notary Mr. Raden Suwandi No. 76 dated 30 June 1954 and No. 82 dated 21 December 1954, BVMNV has its legal form as a public company and named Perum Pengangkut Penumpang Djakarta (Perum PPD).

Based on Government Regulation No. 205 of 1961, the company changes status to state company (PN) under the Department of Land Transportation, Post, Telecommunication and Tourism, became Perusahaan Negara Pengangkutan Penumpang Djakarta (PN PPD). Then based on Government Regulation No. 229 year 1961 dated 20 September 1961, management of PN PPD was handed over from the Department of Land Transportation, Post, Telecommunication and Tourism to the Regional Government of DKI Jakarta. In 1981, management of PN PPD was returned to the national government through the Department of Transportation based on Government Regulation No. 23 of 1981 dated 17 July 1981. The company status became public company or perusahaan umum (perum) based on Government Regulation No. 24 of 1981, thus PN PPD returned into Perum PPD.

In 1991, Mercedes Benz OH 408s with completely built-up (CBU) body by Volgren and some completely knocked down (CKD) units with locally made bodies were purchased in preparation of the 1992 Non-Aligned Movement Summit. These buses were then operated by Perum PPD and Perum DAMRI as city buses in various cites throughout the country. The national government also received some to be operated as staff buses. In 2004, Perum PPD added 55 former Japanese buses to the fleet of regular city buses. Previously, Perum PPD received 30 buses donated by the Government of Japan and did not encounter problems. Perum PPD regular city bus services thrive up to 2011.

2011 starts a new era of public transportation in Jakarta. TransJakarta starts to open new routes, often overlapping Perum PPD regular routes. At this point, Perum PPD buses reach an age of 20 to 30 years without replacement, known as reckless buses and encounters many problems. In January 2011, the Jakarta Department of Transportation eradicates 15 bus route permits, including six Perum PPD routes. In 2013, Perum PPD did a transformation from regular city bus to Bus Rapid Transit (BRT). Perum PPD also did a transformation in the management in several aspects, namely financial, manpower and operational. By the end of 2016, all PPD city bus routes are either eradicated or deformed into a TransJakarta route (ex: PPD 213 into Corridor 5A, PPD 43 into Corridor 10, PPD 210 into Corridor 4A, etc).

Operation
Currently Perum PPD has a number of sub-divisions serving different services.

Strategic Business Unit (SBU) TransBusway
Perum PPD operates 494 of the initial 600 Hino RK8JSKA-NHJ R260 units donated from the Ministry of Transportation for TransJakarta. Operation began at 11 April 2016 with a fleet of 10 buses, then gradually increases up to 494 units. These buses are distinguished by having 1 door each side, instead of the 2 doors on a standard single TransJakarta bus. The doors utilize sliding mechanism. The driver's door on the left anterior is also used for feeder operation. Buses are bodied by Restu Ibu Pusaka (Integra), Rahayu Santosa (Cityliner), and Laksana (Discovery). Unlike most newer TransJakarta buses, these units are not equipped with partitions separating the driver from the passengers. Beforehand, these buses are not equipped with CCTV and side running text display boards. However, as TransJakarta sets new service standards, CCTV and side running text display boards are mandatory equipment, therefore these facilities were then equipped to the buses. Seats are arranged to face the aisle. New Tap-On-Bus (TOB) equipment are also being added to support cashless feeder operation. Routes that SBU TransBusway buses serve are daily set by TransJakarta.

Strategic Business Unit (SBU) TransJabodetabek
The main aim of this SBU is to create an urban transport that is effective, efficient, technology based and integrated with the airport and Jabodetabek region. Approximately 150  units are operated under SBU Transjabodetabek. The fleet consists of former APTB units and canceled SBU TransBusway units, therefore has an identical look to SBU TransBusway units. The main difference is by the service sticker on each side, near the doors. Units are operated for JA Connexion, JR Connexion and Transjabodetabek services, which are not integrated to the TransJakarta BRT service. Services are carried out throughout Jabodetabek. The service entirely utilizes the left anterior driver's door. Front-facing seats are featured and some are equipped with bag racks (mostly for JA Connexion service) to accommodate suitcases. All units are Hino RK8JSKA-NHJ R260s with a variety of bodies by Trisakti (Ultima), New Armada (Customed Aristo), and Laksana (Discovery).

Strategic Business Unit (SBU) Trans PPD MAC
Perum PPD operates 59 articulated Zhongtong LCK6180GC buses for TransJakarta in cooperation with PT. Mobilindo Armada Cemerlang. This is the third batch of Zhongtong articulated buses for TransJakarta, after the first batch bought by Perum DAMRI and the second by the Jakarta Department of Transportation. A blue - white livery with blue stripes distinguishes these units from its identical predecessors that were colored with a red - yellow livery. The interior is dominated with yellow railings and features cushioned chairs. The units were imported in 2016, however administration problems led to a delay of operations up to 2019. It is stated that these units are not a part of the 2013 Bus Corruption.

Bali
In early November 2020, Perum PPD expanded its operations to Bali. 12 buses are operated initially, alongside 2 electric buses by BYD and PT INKA. 5 routes will be operated.

Strategic Business Unit (SBU) Bus Repair and Maintenance
SBU Pemeliharaan dan Perbaikan Bus provides reliable repair and maintenance service. Supported by competent manpower, this SBU ensures buses are always at optimum perfect working condition. Aside from serving SBU TransJabodetabek units, this SBU serves other buses that needs maintenance.

References

External links
 Official website
 Perum PPD in Ministry of State-Owned Enterprises website

Bus companies of Indonesia
Transport in Jakarta
Government-owned companies of Indonesia